Mellini is an Italian surname. Notable people with the surname include:

Clarissimo Falconieri Mellini (1794–1859), Italian Catholic cardinal and Camerlengo of the Sacred College of Cardinals
Giovanni Battista Mellini (1405–1478), Italian Roman Catholic bishop and cardinal
Giovanni Garzia Mellini (1562–1629), Italian Roman Catholic prelate, Camerlengo of the Sacred College of Cardinals
Marie Azpiroz Mellini (1889–?), Spanish violinist
Mauro Mellini (1927–2020), Italian lawyer and politician

See also
Mellini Chapel (Santa Maria del Popolo), chapel in the Church of Santa Maria del Popolo in Rome
Ponte Mellini, small village (curazia) of San Marino

Italian-language surnames